The Nigerian National Assembly delegation from Ogun comprises three Senators, representing Ogun East, Ogun Central, and Ogun West, and nine Representatives, representing Ijebu-Ode/Odogbolu/Ijebu North East, Remo, Abeokuta South, Abeokuta North, Egbado South and Ipokia, Ogun East, Imeko Afon/Yewa North, Ado-Odo/Ota, Ifo/Ewekoro.

Fourth Republic

9th Assembly (2019-2023)

8th Assembly (2015-2019)

7th Assembly (2011-2015)

6th Assembly (2007-2011)

The 5th Parliament (2003 - 2007)

The 4th Parliament (1999 -2003)

References
Official Website - National Assembly House of Representatives (Ogun State)
 Senator List

Ogun State
National Assembly (Nigeria) delegations by state